Eupelmus is a genus of insects belonging to the family Eupelmidae.

The genus has cosmopolitan distribution.

Species:
 Eupelmus achreiodes Perkins, 1910 
 Eupelmus acinellus Askew, 2009

References

Eupelmidae
Hymenoptera genera